The Bangamata U-19 Women's International Gold Cup is an international football tournament organised by the Bangladesh Football Federation (BFF) as a tribute to Sheikh Fazilatunnesa Mujib, the wife of Sheikh Mujibur Rahman, the founding father of Bangladesh.

History
The Bangamata U-19 Women's Gold Cup is the youth under 19 Women's national football teams competition in Bangladesh which run under the Bangladesh Football Federation. The tournament was established 2019. The main goal of the tournament is to develop and grow women's national team and age level teams' skill. According to the BFF statement the tournament will be replaced as a national teams tournament instead of Under 19 teams tournament after three completed seasons.

Tournament summaries

Top goal scorers

To goalscorers by edition

References

Bangamata U-19 Women's International Gold Cup
International association football competitions hosted by Bangladesh
Annual sporting events
2019 establishments in Bangladesh
Under-19 association football competitions
Women's international association football competitions